Dennis de Vreugt (born 4 November 1980) is a Dutch chess grandmaster (2000).

Biography
In 1994, in Hengelo Dennis de Vreugt won Netherlands Youth Chess Championship in U16 age group. In 1998, he won European Youth Chess Championship in U18 age group, but in next year Dennis de Vreugt ranked first in European Junior Chess Championship in U20 age group. In 2000, in Istanbul he was included in the Dutch team in 34th Chess Olympiad as the second reservist, but did not play any party. In 2002, in Hoogeveen international chess tournament Dennis de Vreugt shared second place behind the winner Evgeny Alekseev. In 2003, in Santo Domingo he along with Bartosz Soćko, Vadim Milov, Alexander Moiseenko and Liviu-Dieter Nisipeanu took first place in the international chess tournament.

In 2000, he was awarded the FIDE Grandmaster (GM) title.

References

External links

Dennis de Vreugt chess games at 365Chess.com

1980 births
Living people
Dutch chess players
Chess grandmasters